Stoneham may refer to:

Places
Canada
 Stoneham-et-Tewkesbury, a village
 Stoneham Mountain Resort, a ski resort located in this village

United Kingdom
 North Stoneham, a settlement and ecclesiastical parish in Hampshire
 South Stoneham, a settlement and ecclesiastical parish in Hampshire

United States
 Stoneham, Colorado, an unincorporated town in Weld County
 Stoneham, Maine, a town in Oxford County
 Stoneham, Massachusetts, a town in Middlesex County
 Stoneham Township, Chippewa County, Minnesota, a township
 Stoneham, Texas, a ghost town in Grimes County

Other uses
 Stoneham (surname)
 Stoneham numbers, a mathematical class of real numbers
 Stonum or Stoneham, the home of George Read, a signatory to the American Declaration of Independence